Ma Ke  (born 9 February 1990) is a Chinese actor.

Career 
He first appeared in the television series Sun Zhongshan (2001), playing young Pu Yi. 
Ma is best known for his breakthrough role as "Sha Jiejie" in the fantasy romance drama The Journey of Flower (2015), which propelled him to fame in China. He is also known for his role as Qu Yuan in the historical drama Song of Phoenix (2017).

Filmography

Film

Television series

Discography

Singles

Awards and nominations

References

External links

Chinese male film actors
Chinese male television actors
21st-century Chinese male actors
1990 births
Living people
Male actors from Henan
Central Academy of Drama alumni
Hui male actors